Micah A. Hauptman (born December 26, 1973) is an American film and television actor, known for playing the lead role of David Gallo in the film In Stereo, August Hardwicke in the film Parker, and real-life character David Breashears in Everest.

Career 
In 2013, Hauptman played August Hardwicke, a gang-member in the action-thriller Parker along with Jason Statham and Jennifer Lopez.

In 2015, Hauptman appeared as guest in the fifth season of the Showtime's drama series Homeland, he played the role of Mills, a CIA tech. He played the lead role as David Gallo in the romantic comedy film In Stereo along with Beau Garrett. Mel Rodriguez III directed the film, which released on July 3, 2015 by Circus Road Films.

Hauptman played the real-life documentary filmmaker and mountaineer David Breashears in the disaster adventure-thriller film Everest, along with Jason Clarke, Josh Brolin, and Jake Gyllenhaal. Baltasar Kormákur directed the film, which was released on September 18, 2015 by Universal Pictures.

Filmography

Film

Television

References

External links 
 

Living people
American male film actors
American male television actors
21st-century American male actors
Male actors from Philadelphia
People from Montgomery County, Pennsylvania
1973 births